Seeka (Ndyuka for 'renewal') is a Surinamese political party led by Paul Abena representing the interests of rural inhabitants.  Starting in 2005, it ran as part of the "A-Combination" together with the General Liberation and Development Party and the Brotherhood and Unity in Politics, which received 7.3% of the popular votes and five out of 51 seats in The National Assembly. It left the A-Combination in 2015 to form the A Nyun Combination together with the BP-2011 and the Rural Inhabitants' Party, which did not receive a seat in the 2015 general election. Since 2018, the party co-operates with the General Liberation and Development Party, although an attempt to form a joint list was hindered by an anti-list combination law passed by Dési Bouterse.

References

Political parties in Suriname